David Messina (born February 7, 1932 in Palermo) is an Italian journalist and TV presenter.

Career

In printed paper
Graduated in law, he began his journalism career at L'Ora of Palermo as a police reporter. His abilities, thanks to which became professional at the end of 1965, are not neglected by the big names in journalism, having worked as a sports reporter in Tuttosport (as a correspondent in Sicily), he moved to Milan as a correspondent of the newspaper La Stampa, Corriere dello Sport and Gazzetta dello Sport, becoming one of the major brands of the newspaper.

In television
In the late eighties he collaborated with Telemontecarlo, and after with Telelombardia founding programs here at Qui studio a voi stadio and Cartellino Rosso (Red Card). After leaving Telelombardia he went to 7 Gold rush of transmission Diretta Stadio, then Play TV, Canale Italia (conducting various sports and current affairs programs) and Antenna 3.

Books
 Sandro Mazzola vi insegna il calcio
 Va Italia va
 L'Italia di Arrigo Sacchi
 Gioie, brividi, avventure-ecco la storia di 68 anni di mondiali

References

1932 births
Journalists from Palermo
Italian male journalists
Mass media people from Palermo
Living people